Awaz Bin Sayeed Bin Awaz Bin Jabir Bin Abdullah (3 March 1934 – 2 July 1995) (pen name: Chaand), was a modern short-story writer, poet, playwright, Khaka-naveez and humorist from Hyderabad, India.

Early life and family

Awaz Sayeed was born on 3 March 1934 to Sayeed Bin Awaz Bin Jabir Bin Abdullah (father) and Noorunnissa Begum Al Khulaqi (mother).

Awaz Sayeed was a Hadhrami Arab by descent belonging to a family of Hyderabad Deccan, with roots in Mukallah in Hadhramaut (present-day Yemen). He belongs to the Al-Musalli Clan of the Al-Yafai Tribe. His father served as State Financier under His Highness Sultan Omar bin Awadh Al Qu'aiti (Nawab Sir Jan-Baz Jung Bahadur K.C.I.E.) and His Highness Sultan Sir Saleh bin Ghalib Al Qu'aiti (Saif Nawaz Jung Bahadur).

Sayeed completed his early education from Anwar-ul-Uloom High School. Thereafter, he passed out Matriculation from the City College in April 1948, Intermediate from the Chaderghat College in April 1952 and enrolled in Anwar-ul-Uloom College to pursue Bachelor of Arts (B.A.) but only completed the first year owing to his getting employment in the Food Corporation of India in 1954. Awaz Sayeed married Kaneez Fatima in 1960.

Literary career

Sayeed's first Urdu afsana Jeetey Jaagtey was published in 1949 in Nizam-e-Lahore. Thereafter, several of his stories have been published in Urdu magazines of the Indian Sub-continent.

He also wrote humorous works including Shaqsi-Khaka-Nigari (life-sketches) in which he portrayed known personalities of Urdu literature.

Awaz Sayeed's stories have been translated into English, Hindi, and Malayalam.

Some English translations of his Urdu short stories have been included in at least two recent English compilations of translated works by Urdu writers of the Indian Sub-Continent. The first book Despairing voices: a collection of modern Urdu short stories edited and translated by Syed Sarwar (Satyam Publishing House, 2011) includes his four Urdu short stories Raat Wala Ajnabi ('The Night's Stranger'), Udaas Nasal Ka Aakhri Aadmi ('Last Man of the Melancholic Race'), Andha Kunwan ('Dry Well') and Coma. The second book New Urdu Writings: From India and Pakistan by Rakhshanda Jalil (Westland Ltd, 2013) includes the story Chubhan ('Pin-Prick').

The 1998 M.Phil thesis of Nusrat Jahan is titled ‘Awaz Sayeed Ki Shaqsiyat Aur Fan’ (عوض سید - شخصیت اور فن) and the 2006 M. Phil thesis by Aliya Maqsood is titled 'Awaz Sayeed Ba Haisiyat Khaka Nigar' (عوض سید - بحیثیت خا کہ نگار).

Books

Awaz Sayeed wrote seven books: six of them short stories: Sai Ka Safar (1969), Teesra Mujasamma (1973), Raat Wala Ajnabi (1977), Kohe-Nida (1977), Benaam Mausamon Ka Nauha (1987) and Kuwaan Aadmi Aur Samandar (1993) and a book on khake (personality sketches) called Khake (1985).

The second reprint of the book Khake was produced in 2006 by his son Ausaf Sayeed in association with the Urdu Academy Jeddah. The book was released by Arjun Singh, the Minister of Human Resource Development, Government of India, during a special function in Jeddah. In August 2009, Sayeed's published and unpublished works was published in two volumes titled Kuliyaat-e-Awaz Sayeed by his son Ausaf Sayeed, which was released by Shri Mohammad Hamid Ansari, Vice-President of India. The book has been published by Educational Publishing House, New Delhi.

Death

Sayeed died on 2 July 1995, following a heart failure while on a visit to Chicago, Illinois, USA. He is buried at the Rosehill Cemetery, Peterson in Chicago.

External links
 Awaz Sayeed's Urdu Literature Page
 Fascinating Sketches -- Arab News
 Urdu Adab Blogspot

Hadhrami people
Indian male short story writers
Indian people of Yemeni descent
Urdu-language short story writers
Urdu-language poets from India
20th-century Indian Muslims
Writers from Hyderabad, India
1930 births
1995 deaths
Indian humorists
20th-century Indian poets
20th-century Indian short story writers
Writers from Andhra Pradesh
Indian male poets
20th-century Indian male writers